Capo Gallo Lighthouse is an active lighthouse located on the northern tip of the promontory of Monte Pellegrino marks the western entrance to the Gulf of Palermo, Sicily on the Tyrrhenian Sea.

Description
The building, after the automation of the lighthouse, went into ruin and the Municipality of Palermo plans to turn the lighthouse into a Museum even because it makes part of the Nature Reserve of Capo Gallo.

The tower and the lantern are painted white; the lantern dome grey metallic. The lighthouse is completely automated and managed by the Marina Militare with the identification code number 3198 E.F.

See also
 List of lighthouses in Italy
 Mondello

References

External links

 Servizio Fari Marina Militare

Lighthouses in Italy
Buildings and structures in Sicily